Johan Anuar (7 August 1965 – 10 January 2022) was an Indonesian politician. A member of the Golkar party, he served as Deputy Regent of Ogan Komering Ulu from 2016 to 2021 and served as Regent for one day, 8 March 2021, following the death of Kuryana Azis. He died of cancer in Palembang on 10 January 2022, at the age of 56.

References

1965 births
2022 deaths
Golkar politicians
21st-century Indonesian politicians
People from South Sumatra
Deaths from cancer in Indonesia